The 1998 Swedish Golf Tour, known as the Telia Tour for sponsorship reasons, was the 13th season of the Swedish Golf Tour, a series of professional golf tournaments for women held in Sweden and Finland.

The tour extended to Finland for the first time with the inaugural Felix Finnish Ladies Open held at Aura Golf in Turku.

Pernilla Sterner and Marie Hedberg both won two tournaments and Nina Karlsson won her second Order of Merit.

Schedule
The season consisted of 11 tournaments played between May and September, where one event was held in Finland.

Order of Merit

Source:

See also
1998 Swedish Golf Tour (men's tour)

References

External links
Official homepage of the Swedish Golf Tour

Swedish Golf Tour (women)
Swedish Golf Tour (women)